Clarisse Bader (28 December 1840 in Strasbourg – 5 February 1902 in Paris) was a French writer.

She was the author of Femme Grecque: Étude de la vie antique ( "Greek Woman: Study of Ancient Life") (1872),  La femme française dans les temps modernes ( "The French woman in modern times") (1883), for which she was celebrated by the Académie française, Le comte de Chambrun, ses Etudes politiques et litteraires ( "The Count of Chambrun, his political and literary studies") (1889) and Women in ancient India: Moral and Literary Studies.  She is a Gutenberg author and many of her works are still in print.

References

External links
 
 

1840 births
1902 deaths
Writers from Strasbourg
19th-century French journalists
19th-century French women writers
19th-century women journalists